That Day After Everyday is a Hindi short film directed by Anurag Kashyap, written by Nitin Bhardwaj, and produced by Sankalp Acharekar  & Omer Haidar. Starring Sandhya Mridul, Radhika Apte, Geetanjali Thapa and Aranya Kaur. The film takes the audience on an emotional ride ending at an action filled crescendo.

Plot
The film deals with eve teasing, a social issue. The film revolves around three women who overcome their helplessness in a bad situation.

Cast
Sandhya Mridul
Radhika Apte
Arannya Kaur
Geetanjali Thapa
Mahesh Balraj
Akash Sinha
Alok Pandey as Road side romio
Ravi Choudhary

References

External links
 http://www.largeshortfilms.com/thatdayaftereveryday/film.html
 
 http://technoparkliving.com/2013/11/anurag-kashyaps-that-day-after-everyday-becoming-viral/

2010s Hindi-language films
2013 films
Indian short films
2013 short films
Films directed by Anurag Kashyap